IC 447 is a reflection nebula in the constellation Monoceros.

References
 NGC/IC Data for IC 447

External links

IC 0447
IC 0447
0447